DRW is a three-character combination which could mean:

DRW Trading Group, a proprietary electronic trading firm based in Chicago.
 Dan Ryan Woods, a forest preserve in Cook County, Illinois
 Detroit Red Wings
 Deutsches Rechtswörterbuch
 IATA airport code for Darwin International Airport
 A type of filename extension (Drawn File.)
 Shorthand for Doctor Who, a British science fiction television show.